The Western Ontario Junior C Hockey League was a Junior "C" ice hockey league in Ontario, Canada, sanctioned by the Ontario Hockey Association.  The Champion of the Western will compete for the All-Ontario Championship and the Clarence Schmalz Cup.  The WOJCHL merged into the Provincial Junior Hockey League in the Summer of 2016.

Western Junior "C" Hockey League 1966–1970
Central Junior "C" Hockey League 1970–1980
Grey-Bruce Junior "C" Hockey League 1980–1988
Western Ontario Junior "C" Hockey League 1988–2016

History 

The Western Junior C Hockey League was founded in 1966 when the original OHA Central Junior C Hockey League, a large league, was divided up.  In 1970, the Western league changed its name to the Central league.  A couple years later, another league from the old Central league, the Intercounty Jr. C league merged with the new Central league.  Brought into the fold was the Caledonia Corvairs who won the league and the Clarence Schmalz Cup in 1973, then jumped to the Junior B level.

In 1969, the Hanover Hurricanes made the jump from the Western Junior D Hockey League to the Central Junior "C".  Early powerhouses in the league were the Listowel Cyclones, Kincardine Kinucks, and New Hamburg Hahns.  The Hanover Barons are the only remaining team that is still a member from the founding of the league in 1966.  They won two Clarence Schmalz Cups while playing in the league and dominated in the 1960s.  They were promoted to Junior "B" in 1977.  The league became one of at least four different leagues in the OHA to be known as the Central Jr. C league since 1960.  The league may have changed its name in 1970 to the Grey-Bruce Junior C Hockey League.  This lasted until 1988, as the league granted expansion to 2 teams that were not in Grey or Bruce County—in 1987, the Mount Forest Patriots and in 1989, the Brussels Bulls.  In 1988, the league donned its present name, the Western Junior "C" Hockey League.

From 1972 until 1976, the Central league (now the Western league) featured a variety of teams from the Niagara region of Ontario.  In 1974, the majority of these teams broke away to form the Niagara & District Junior C Hockey League.  In 1976, the remainder of these teams walked away to form the Southwestern Junior B Hockey League, which folded in 1978 and the remaining teams went mostly to the Niagara District league to help form a Western division.

In 1987, the Port Elgin Bears withdrew from a playoffs series due to perceived on-ice violence by the Hanover Barons. The OHA investigated the incident, which received national publicity when Port Elgin's coach was supported by Otto Jelinek, the Canadian Minister of State for Fitness and Amateur Sport. Port Elgin team officials were given one-year suspensions when the OHA found no evidence to justify abandoning the series.

During the 2004-05 season, the WJCHL played an interlocking schedule with the Georgian Mid-Ontario Junior C Hockey League.  The WJCHL lost the series with 44 losses, 32 victories, and 6 ties.

On May 29, 2008, the Western league and the Ontario Hockey Association allowed for the Mitchell Hawks to move from the more southerly Southern Ontario Junior Hockey League and into the Western league for the 2008-09 season.  This marks the second time the Hawks have been in the loop, the first being the mid-1960s.  Also, they share the same name as the Walkerton Hawks, although Walkerton's name is from the raptor (since 1999), while Mitchell's is from the Native Chief.

In 2012, the OHA entered into talks with the Western League and the Southern Ontario Junior Hockey League.  If successful, the northern half of the SOJHL would become the "Southern Division" of the WOJCHL, while the original teams would form a "Northern Division".  In the Summer of 2013, the OHA opted to realign the SOJHL with the Niagara & District Junior C Hockey League instead.  The northern half of the SOJHL remained the SOJHL, while the southern half merged with the NDJCHL.  Weeks later the OHA announced that the Eastern Division of the NDJCHL would remain as the Niagara League, while the West would break off and form a new Midwestern Junior C Hockey League.

The teams

2015–16 League Playoffs

Western Junior "C" Champions 

A Red Row indicates a team representing the league in the Super Jr. C Playdowns without being the known league champion.
A Blue Row indicates a team representing the league in the OHA Jr. C Playdowns without being the known league champion.

Regular Season Champions

Former Member Teams 
Arthur Eagles (1978–1980)
Brantford Penguins (1974–1976)
Brussels Bulls (1989–1999)
Caledonia Corvairs (1972–1973)
Clinton Mustangs (1974–1985)
Elmira Sugar Kings (1966–1970)
Exeter Hawks (1968–1969)
Fergus Green Machine (1980–1982)
Grand Valley Harvesters (1989–1993)
Hespeler Shamrocks (1966–1970)
Ingersoll Marlands (1973–1976)
New Hamburg Hahns (1966–1977)
Kitchener Flying Dutchmen (19xx-1973)
Listowel Cyclones (1972–1979)
London Optimists (19xx-1976)
Owen Sound Salvagemen (1974–1975)
Paris-Burford Flyers (1972–1974)
Port Elgin Bears (1976–1989)
Preston Raiders (1966–1969)
St. Thomas Colonels (1972–1973)
Simcoe Jets (1972–1974)
Tillsonburg Titans (1974–1976)
Wiarton Wolves (1994–2003)
Woodstock Navy-Vets (1972–1976)

Professional alumni 
National Hockey League
Kevin Czuczman (Walkerton 2008-09)
Louie DeBrusk (Port Elgin 1986–87)
Aaron Downey (Grand Valley 1990–91)
Paul MacDermid (Port Elgin 1979–80)
Jeff MacMillan (Hanover 1995–96)
Jim Nahrgang (New Hamburg 1966–67)
Nathan Perrott (Walkerton 1992–93)
Kevin Pollock (Hanover)
Curtis Sanford (Wiarton 1994–95)
Darryl Sittler (Elmira 1966–67)
Jordan Willis (Hanover 1991–92)

See also
 Provincial Junior Hockey League for PJHL Pollock Division

References

External links 

Western Jr. "C" Website
OHA Website

C
C